Ischnocnema juipoca is a species of frog in the family Brachycephalidae.
It is endemic to Brazil.
Its natural habitats are moist savanna, subtropical or tropical moist shrubland, subtropical or tropical dry lowland grassland, pastureland, and rural gardens.
It is threatened by habitat loss.

References

juipoca
Endemic fauna of Brazil
Amphibians of Brazil
Taxonomy articles created by Polbot
Amphibians described in 1978